Robert Curzon, 14th Baron Zouche (16 March 1810 – 2 August 1873), styled The Honourable Robert Curzon between 1829 and 1870, was an English traveller, diplomat and author, active in the Near East. He was responsible for acquiring several important and late Biblical manuscripts from Eastern Orthodox monasteries.

Early life
Curzon was the son of the Hon. Robert Curzon, younger son of Assheton Curzon, 1st Viscount Curzon, and his wife Harriet Anne Bishopp, 13th Baroness Zouche (Bishopp also spelt Bisshopp).  Baroness Zouche succeeded to the Barony from her father Sir Cecil Bisshopp the 8th Baronet Bishopp, of Parham Park in the county of (today) West Sussex (from 1815 the 12th Baron Zouche of Hayngworth) after her brother Lieutenant-Colonel Cecil Bisshopp and Sir Cecil's heir was killed in the War of 1812 against the Americans.  The Bishopp Baronetcy was inherited by a cousin. Curzon was educated at Charterhouse and Christ Church, Oxford.

Career
In 1831, he succeeded his father as member of parliament for Clitheroe, a seat he only held until the following year. In his Visits to Monasteries in the Levant (1849), he described and justified his takings. He visited Mount Athos in 1837, and at the Monastery of St Paul, he recounts how the abbot said "We make no use of the old books, and should be glad if you would accept one'", upon which he took two, including a fourteenth-century illuminated Bulgarian gospel, now in the British Library.

In 1842-1843 Curzon was joint British Commissioner in Erzurum as part of the British-Turkish-Persian-Russian boundary commission sitting to delineate the Turkish and Persian frontier.

Lord Zouche succeeded his mother in the barony in 1870. He died in August 1873, aged 63, and was succeeded in the title firstly by his son Robert Nathaniel Cecil George Curzon the 15th Baron (born 12 Jul 1851, died 31 Jul 1915) and then by his daughter Darea Curzon, 16th Baroness Zouche (born 13 Nov 1860, died 7 Apr 1917).

In 1834, he brought some manuscripts from Palestine (including the Greek New Testament codices 548, 552-554) and in 1837 from the Athos peninsula, among them the important Bulgarian Gospels of Tsar Ivan Alexander and the gospel codices 547, 549-551, 910-911). After his death, they were first loaned to the British Museum, then donated by his daughter.  They have since been transferred to the British Library.

Works

See also 
Obituary in The Times

References

External links

 
 
 
 
 

1810 births
1873 deaths
19th-century English nobility
People educated at Charterhouse School
Barons Zouche
Curzon, Robert
Curzon, Robert
UK MPs who inherited peerages